In Japanese mythology,  (あまつみかぼし), also called  (あめのかがせお), Hoshigami Kaseo (星神香香背男, ほしがみかがせお), Kaseo (香香背男, かがせお), Amenoseo (天背男, あめのせお), or Ame no Murakumo no Mikoto (天村雲命, あめのむらくものみこと), was originally a rebellious Shinto god, possibly malevolent, who would not submit to the will of the other Ama-tsu-kami.

Under Chinese Buddhist influence, the god was identified with Myōken either as the pole star or Venus, before being combined with the god of all stars, .

In some versions he was born from Kagutsuchi's blood. He is mentioned in passing in the Nihon Shoki as being subdued by Takemikazuchi during the latter's conquest of the land of Izumo.

In popular culture 

Amatsu-Mikaboshi, the Chaos King,  is a fictional character appearing in American comic books published by Marvel Comics. The character is usually depicted as a supervillain and demonic god of evil who is best known as an enemy of Hercules and Thor. He is based on the Mikaboshi of Japanese mythology.

Amatsu-Mikaboshi first appeared in Thor: Blood Oath #6 (February 2006), and was adapted from mythology by Michael Oeming and Scott Kolins.

The character subsequently appears in Ares #1-5 (March–July 2006), and The Incredible Hercules #117-120 (May–August 2008).

Amatsumikaboshi is the God of Stars who have gifted two stellar-demon swords of light and shadow, Zanseiken and Bakuseiken, to Earth in Nara Japan, later the two swords wielded by qilin daiyōkai Kirinmaru, who rules in the Eastern Lands, and his daughter Rion, in episode "The Girl Named Rion" of  Yashahime: Princess Half-Demon. He is also known as the God of Chaos that he's loyal to the Grim Comet and its true form: the Grim Butterfly. In episode "The Collapse of the Windmill of Time", Sesshōmaru's mother mentioned that the Zanseiken is the Sword of Amatsumikaboshi that her granddaughter Towa is wielding while they fighting Meidomaru. In episode "Father and Daughter", after Setsuna severed the red thread of fate between Rion and Kirinmaru the second time for their death, the two swords have been merged to become the Sword of Amatsumikaboshi as their souls are being sent inside as it sent back to heaven as the Grim Butterfly is destroyed.

See also
 List of Japanese deities
 Glossary of Shinto

References 

Japanese gods
Stellar gods
Shinto kami
Chaos gods
Venusian deities
Evil gods
Kunitsukami
Amatsukami